No Fear is an American lifestyle clothing brand that was created in 1989 by Mark Simo, Brian Simo, Boris Said, and Marty Moates. No Fear Inc. products are sold at various retail stores and company owned stores. It also offers No Fear energy drinks under the same brand, in a joint venture with South Beach Beverage Company. The company currently employs about 450 people. On February 25, 2011, they filed for Chapter 11 bankruptcy. The UK-based sports retailer Frasers Group —then known as Sports Direct International— bought No Fear in August 2011.

Clothing
No Fear T-shirts were very popular from the mid-1990s to early-2000s, peculiarly not having been endorsed by any celebrities. Shirts typically featured existential slogans or quotes that touted the virtues of extreme sports. Common themes included death anxiety, lack of laziness, contempt for social norms, and the law.

No Fear Energy Drink
No Fear began distributing a No Fear Energy drink through partnership with SoBe.  Flavors and versions currently consist of:
Original (grapefruit)
Sugar Free
Motherload (berry)
Bloodshot (orange/dragonfruit)

No Fear is the official energy drink of the World Extreme Cagefighting, and sponsors fighter Urijah Faber.

Promotion
No Fear began a promotion in 2009 to earn No Fear "cred" by entering codes found under the tab of the cans.  Participants can use points earned to acquire No Fear Gear. Grand Prizes include admission to:
Mixed Martial Arts event
Motocross event
Surfing trip to Hawaii
Concert tour with Lamb of God.

On February 12, 2008, World Extreme Cagefighting announced that the No Fear Energy Drink brand had entered a deal with the WEC as the promotion's official presenting sponsor and exclusive energy drink sponsor. The partnership was begun with an event that took place in Albuquerque, New Mexico, the next day.

No Fear has a sponsor for the NASCAR Sprint Cup Series with NASCAR driver Boris Said.  It has also sponsored Team Pacquiao on many occasions.

See also
No Fear Racing
Mixed martial arts clothing

References

External links

1990s fashion
Clothing companies established in 1989
Companies based in Carlsbad, California
Privately held companies based in California
Sportswear brands
Clothing brands of the United States
Sports Direct